MAKNA (Majlis Kanser Nasional) or National Cancer Council Malaysia is a is a not-for-profit organization dedicated to reducing the pain, suffering and morbidity that cancer patients often experience. The organization provides curative care, preventive care, cancer research, and support services to cancer patients and their families, high-risk groups, and the general public in Malaysia and abroad. In addition, MAKNA operates a bursary program that provides financial support to individuals with cancer.

MAKNA is committed to expanding its support services and plans to open a total of nine halfway houses across Malaysia, including three in Bertam in Pulau Pinang, Kubang Kerian in Kelantan and Kuching, Sarawak.

The PPUKM - MAKNA Cancer Centre was established in 1999 and includes The Tengku Ampuan Afzan Oncology Ward, Radiotherapy, Research facilities, and Bone Marrow Transplant Unit, which is one of the largest in the country. In 2014, the centre provided treatment to 1,396 patients.

References

External links
 

Cancer organizations
Medical and health organisations based in Malaysia
Organizations established in 1994
1994 establishments in Malaysia